The United States Under-19 cricket team represents the United States in international under-19 cricket.

In 2020 former U.S.A. player Kevin Darlington was appointed coach of the team.

The coach for the 2015 ICC Americas Under-19 Championship was Thiru Kumaran, a former Indian Test player.

Performances at Under-19 World Cups

List of captains
Two players have captained the United States in under-19 One Day International (ODI) matches.

Records
All records listed are for under-19 One-Day International (ODI) matches only.

Team records

Highest totals
 220/8 (49 overs), v. , at SSC Ground, Colombo, 14 February 2006
 217 (48.1 overs), v. , at Queenstown Events Centre, Queenstown, 19 January 2010
 215 (45.4 overs), v. , at NCC Ground, Colombo, 6 February 2006

Lowest totals
 115 (33.1 overs), v. , at Nelson Park, Napier, 25 January 2010
 115 (29.1 overs), v. , at P. Sara, Colombo, 7 February 2006
 125 (29.3 overs), v. , at P. Sara, Colombo, 15 February 2006

Individual records

Most career runs
 136 – Hemant Punoo (from 5 matches in 2006, at an average of 27.20)
 125 – Greg Sewdial (from 6 matches in 2010, at an average of 31.25)
 109 – Steven Taylor (from 6 matches in 2010, at an average of 21.80)

Highest individual scores
 70 (90 balls) – Andy Mohammed, v. , Queenstown Events Centre, Queenstown, 16 January 2010
 65 (52 balls) – Hemant Punoo, v. , at NCC Ground, Colombo, 6 February 2006
 64 (76 balls) – Hemant Punoo, v. , at SSC Ground, Colombo, 14 February 2006

Most career wickets
 10 – Saqeeb Saleem (from 6 matches in 2010, at an average of 14.50)
 8 – Dominic Audain (from 5 matches in 2006, at an average of 24.00)
 8 – Abhimanyu Rajp (from 5 matches in 2006, at an average of 24.87)

Best bowling performances
 5/61 (10 overs) – Abhimanyu Rajp, v. , at P. Sara, Colombo, 15 February 2006
 4/38 (9 overs) – Saqeeb Saleem, v. , at Nelson Park, Napier, 25 January 2010
 3/18 (7 overs) – Hammad Shahid, v. , at Nelson Park, Napier, 27 January 2010

References

Under-19 cricket teams
Under19
Cricket